Katarina Srebotnik and Piet Norval were the defending champions, but lost in second round to Kim Clijsters and Lleyton Hewitt.

Mariaan de Swardt and David Adams won the title, defeating Rennae Stubbs and Todd Woodbridge 6–3, 3–6, 6–3 in the final. It was the 2nd and final mixed doubles Grand Slam title for both players in their careers.

Seeds
All seeds received a bye into the second round.

Draw

Finals

Top half

Section 1

Section 2

Bottom half

Section 3

Section 4

External links
 Official Results Archive (WTA)
2000 French Open – Doubles draws and results at the International Tennis Federation

Mixed Doubles
French Open - Mixed doubles
French Open - Mixed doubles
French Open by year – Mixed doubles